Émile Legault (born April 10, 2000) is a Canadian soccer player who plays as a defender.

Early life
Legault was born in Longueuil, Quebec, and grew up in nearby Saint-Lambert. He began playing soccer at age four with local club AS Saint-Lambert.

Club career

Auxerre
Legault moved to France with his mother at age twelve, where he was recruited by the academy of Ligue 2 side AJ Auxerre. Initially a forward, Legault converted first to a central midfielder and then to a full-back while at Auxerre. In 2016, he joined the club's U-17 squad.

Pacific FC
On April 25, 2019, Legault signed with Canadian Premier League side Pacific FC. He made his professional debut for the club on May 1 against Valour FC and would make a total of thirteen league appearances that season. On November 4, 2019, the club announced it would not be exercising Legault's contract option for next season.

Rio Grande Valley FC
On March 7, 2020, Legault joined USL Championship side Rio Grande Valley FC. He made four appearances that season.

Mont-Royal Outremont
In July 2021, Legault returned to Canada, signing with PLSQ side Mont-Royal Outremont.

International career
Legault has represented Canada at multiple youth levels. In May 2018, he was called up to the Canadian U-21 squad for the 2018 Toulon Tournament. Legault was also named to the Canadian U-20 squad for the 2018 CONCACAF U-20 Championship on October 24, 2018. Legault was named to the Canadian U-23 provisional roster for the 2020 CONCACAF Men's Olympic Qualifying Championship on February 26, 2020.

Personal life
Legault holds Canadian and French citizenship.

Career statistics

References

External links

2000 births
Living people
Association football defenders
Canadian soccer players
French footballers
Soccer people from Quebec
Sportspeople from Longueuil
People from Saint-Lambert, Quebec
Canadian people of French descent
Canadian expatriate soccer players
French expatriate footballers
Expatriate soccer players in the United States
Canadian expatriate sportspeople in the United States
French expatriate sportspeople in the United States
AJ Auxerre players
Pacific FC players
Rio Grande Valley FC Toros players
Canadian Premier League players
USL Championship players
Canada men's youth international soccer players
Canada men's under-23 international soccer players
CS Mont-Royal Outremont players